Bulgaria competed at the inaugural 7 sports 2018 European Championships from 2 to 12 August 2018. It competed in 4 sports.

Medallists

Aquatics

Diving

Men

Swimming

Men

Women

Synchronised swimming

Athletics

Men 
Track and road

Field events

Women 
Track and road

Field events

Gymnastics

Men

Qualification

Individual finals

Women

Qualification

Rowing

Men

External links
 European Championships official site 

2018
Nations at the 2018 European Championships
2018 in Bulgarian sport